Székkutas railway station is a railway station in Hungary.

External links
 

Railway stations in Hungary
Railway stations opened in 1870